Jean de la Roque (1661 – December 8, 1745) was a French traveller and journalist born in Marseille. He was the son of Pierre de la Roque, a merchant who his remembered for introducing coffee to Marseille in 1644, and the brother of Antoine de la Roque (1672-1744), a noted journalist with whom he collaborated with on the magazine Mercure de France.

Jean de la Roque was the author of Voyage en Syrie et au mont Liban (1722), a book written about his experiences in the Levant, which he first visited in 1689. Here he describes the customs of the various regional tribes, and provides information on the ruins at Baalbek. In 1708-10 and 1711-13 he participated on two expeditions to the Arabian peninsula, and afterwards published his Arabian experiences in a work called Voyage dans l’Arabie heureuse (1716). In this treatise he gives a highly descriptive and detailed account of coffee plantations and the coffee trade in Yemen.

References 
 This article is based on a translation of an article from the French Wikipedia.
 The British-Yemeni Society Essay on La Roque's "Voyage de l’Arabie Heureuse"

French explorers
French journalists
1661 births
1745 deaths
Writers from Marseille
French male non-fiction writers